Ichwane Lenyoka is the third studio album by South African rapper Big Zulu. It was released by  Nkabi Records on 3 September 2021 in South Africa. The album features Mduduzi Ncube, Lwah Ndlunkulu, ProKid, Xola, Kwazi, Cofi, Nhlanhla Mhlongo, Ami Faku, Siya Ntuli, Samthing Soweto, Sjava, Aubrey Qwana, Mnqobi Yazo, Zuluboy, Intaba Yase Dubai and Riky Rick.

The album debuted number 1 in South Africa.

Background 
Zulu announced album via his twitter account on January 20, 2021.

Singles 
"Mali Eningi" (featuring South African singer Ntaba Yase Dubai and South African rapper Riky Rick) was released  in  South Africa on 20 November 2020 as the album's lead single. 

The second single, "" (featuring South African singer Mduduzi Ncube), was released on 11 March 2021. The song reached number 1 on the SA iTunes charts.

Inhluphekosingle.

Track listing

Accolades 
At the 2021 South African Hip Hop Awards, Ichwane Lenyoka won Album of the Year and Best Male.

|-
|rowspan="2"|2021
| rowspan="2"|<div style="text-align: center;">Ichwane Lenyoka
| Album of the Year 
|
|-
| Best Male
|

Commercial performance 
Ichwane Lenyoka debuted number one on iTunes Hip hop/rap charts.

Certifications and sales

Personnel 
All credits are adapted from Genius and AllMusic.

 Big Zulu – vocals, writer 
 Ami Faku – vocals, writer 
 Samthing Soweto – vocals, writer 
 Zuluboy – vocals, writer 
 Sjava – writer, vocals 
 Lwah Ndlunkulu – vocals, writer 
 Gobi Beast - producer 
 Lazarus Nyashanu –  producer 
 CeLza – producer 
 Thabiso Manama – producer 
 Ndu Browns – producer  
 Xola – producer

Release history

References 

2021 albums